Stuart Eugene Malin (born October 1, 1948), known as Gene Malin, is an American former professional tennis player.

A native of Los Angeles, Malin possessed one of the fastest serves on tour and had a singles ranking as high as 116 in the world. His best performance on the Grand Prix circuit came at Cleveland in 1979, registering wins over Ramesh Krishnan and Adriano Panatta, before he lost a close semi-final to Ilie Năstase. During his time on tour he also defeated former world number one John Newcombe.

Malin was a coach of the India Davis Cup team which reached the final in 1987 and has been the tour coach of several players including Stephanie Rehe, Bonnie Gadusek and Barbara Potter.

References

External links
 
 

1948 births
Living people
American male tennis players
American tennis coaches
Tennis players from Los Angeles